The Hill of Ward (formerly Tlachtgha) is a hill in County Meath, Ireland.

Geography 
The hill lies between Athboy (to the west) and Ráth Chairn (to the east). During medieval times it was the site of great festivals, including one at which winter fires or bone fires (Tine Cnámh) were lit at Samhain, the forerunner of the modern Halloween. It is associated with the figure Tlachtga, a druidess in Irish mythology who is said to have given birth to triplets on the hill.

History 
The Hill of Ward is the site of an Iron Age earthen ringfort, which was in later times associated with the Kings of Mide of and of Munster. The hill featured in Irish tales of Tlachtga and her father Mug Ruith, who was said to have ridden his flying machine roth rámach over it. In 1168 High King Ruaidrí Ua Conchobair held a massive gathering at the site. According to Giraldus Cambrensis in 1172 Tigernán Ua Ruairc King of Bréifne was killed there at a parley with Norman invaders.

The hill got its English name from a landowner, Ward, who had been evicted from his land during the invasion of Oliver Cromwell in 1649. The land was given to a Roundhead soldier. The Ward family, whose forebears were landowners of the hill and after whom the hill was named, are living in County Meath today.

Recent archaeological work has been done on the site, confirming that it was used as a ritual site for many years.

References

External links
 Aerial views of Hill of Ward

Mountains and hills of County Meath
National Monuments in County Meath
Archaeological sites in County Meath
Gaeltacht places in County Meath
Royal sites of Ireland